These are the films shown at the 11th New York Underground Film Festival, held from March 10–16, 2004.

See also
 New York Underground Film Festival site
 2004 Festival Archive

New York Underground Film Festival
New York Underground Film Festival, 2004
Underground Film Festival
New York Underground Film
2004 in American cinema